Liberian Suite is an album by American pianist, composer and bandleader Duke Ellington recorded for the Columbia label in 1947. The album was Ellingon's second 10" LP album and one of his earlier works on the Columbia label. The suite represents one of Ellington's early extended compositions and was commissioned for the  Liberian centennial. The Liberian Suite was released on CD as bonus tracks on Ellington Uptown in 2004.

Reception
The Allmusic review awarded the album 3 stars and stated "Liberian Suite was his first international commission, from the government of the African nation, to celebrate the 100th anniversary of its founding by freed American slaves-it was the first formal manifestation of a process by which Ellington would be a virtual musical ambassador to the world by the end of the next decade. As to the music, it is not Ellington's most sophisticated piece of music, but it is filled with bracing rhythms, juicy parts for the horns and saxes, and one stunning vocal part".  

Around 1953 Philips brought out the Liberian Suite on Minigroove 33 1/3 under number B 07611R

Track listing
:All compositions by Duke Ellington
 "The Liberian Suite: I Like the Sunrise" – 4:28
 "The Liberian Suite: Dance No. 1" – 4:50
 "The Liberian Suite: Dance No. 2" – 3:26
 "The Liberian Suite: Dance No. 3" – 3:45
 "The Liberian Suite: Dance No. 4" – 3:04
 "The Liberian Suite: Dance No. 5" – 5:08
Recorded at Liederkranz Hall in New York on December 24, 1947

Personnel
Duke Ellington – piano
Shorty Baker, Shelton Hemphill, Al Killian, Francis Williams – trumpet
Ray Nance – trumpet, violin
Lawrence Brown, Tyree Glenn – trombone
Claude Jones – valve trombone
Jimmy Hamilton – clarinet, tenor saxophone
Russell Procope – alto saxophone, clarinet
Johnny Hodges – alto saxophone
Al Sears – tenor saxophone
Harry Carney – baritone saxophone
Fred Guy – guitar
Oscar Pettiford, Junior Raglin – bass
Sonny Greer  – drums
Al Hibbler – vocal (track 1)

References

Columbia Records albums
Duke Ellington albums
1948 albums